Alexander Paterson (1766–1831) was a Roman Catholic bishop who served as the Vicar Apostolic of the Lowland District from 1825 to 1827, then, following district name change, Vicar Apostolic of the Eastern District from 1827 to 1831.

Born in Pathhead, near Enzie in Banffshire, Scotland in March 1766, he was ordained a priest in 1791. He was appointed the Coadjutor Vicar Apostolic of the Lowland District and Titular Bishop of Cybistra by the Holy See on 14 May 1816. He was consecrated to the Episcopate on 18 August 1816. The principal consecrator was Bishop Alexander Cameron, and the principal co-consecrator was Bishop Aeneas Chisholm. On the retirement of Bishop Alexander Cameron on 20 August 1825, he automatically succeeded as the Vicar Apostolic of the Lowland District. On 13 February 1827, the Lowland District was renamed the Eastern District, with Bishop Paterson as the vicar apostolic. He died in office on 30 October 1831, aged 65.

See also

 Cybistra

References

1766 births
1831 deaths
Apostolic vicars of Scotland
19th-century Roman Catholic bishops in Scotland
People from Kirkcaldy
Scottish Roman Catholic bishops